In mathematics, the formal derivative is an operation on elements of a polynomial ring or a ring of formal power series that mimics the form of the derivative from calculus.  Though they appear similar, the algebraic advantage of a formal derivative is that it does not rely on the notion of a limit, which is in general impossible to define for a ring.  Many of the properties of the derivative are true of the formal derivative, but some, especially those that make numerical statements, are not.

Formal differentiation is used in algebra to test for multiple roots of a polynomial.

Definition
The definition of formal derivative is as follows: fix a ring R (not necessarily commutative) and let A = R[x] be the ring of polynomials over R.  Then the formal derivative is an operation on elements of A, where if

then its formal derivative is

just as for polynomials over the real or complex numbers. Here  does not mean multiplication in the ring, but rather  where  is never used inside the sum.

There is a problem with this definition for noncommutative rings. The formula itself is correct, but there is no standard form of a polynomial. Therefore using this definition it is difficult to prove that

Axiomatic definition well suited for noncommutative rings
As opposed to the above formula one may define the formal derivative axiomatically as the map  satisfying the following properties. 

1)  for all 

2) The normalization axiom,  

3) The map commutes with the addition operation in the polynomial ring,  

4) The map satisfies Leibniz's law with respect to the polynomial ring's multiplication operation, 

One may prove that this axiomatic definition yields a well defined map respecting all of the usual ring axioms.

The formula above (i.e. the definition of the formal derivative when the coefficient ring is commutative) is a direct consequence of the aforementioned axioms:

Properties
It can be verified that:

 Formal differentiation is linear: for any two polynomials f(x),g(x) in R[x] and elements r,s of R we have

When R is not commutative there is another, different, linearity property in which r and s appear on the right rather than on the left.  When R does not contain an identity element, neither of these reduces to the case of simply a sum of polynomials or the sum of a polynomial with a multiple of another polynomial, which must also be included as a "linearity" property.

 The formal derivative satisfies the Leibniz rule:

Note the order of the factors; when R is not commutative this is important.

These two properties make D a derivation on A (see module of relative differential forms for a discussion of a generalization).

Application to finding repeated factors
As in calculus, the derivative detects multiple roots. If R is a field then R[x] is a Euclidean domain, and in this situation we can define multiplicity of roots; for every polynomial f(x) in R[x] and every element r of R, there exists a nonnegative integer mr and a polynomial g(x) such that

where g(r)≠0.  mr is the multiplicity of r as a root of f.  It follows from the Leibniz rule that in this situation, mr is also the number of differentiations that must be performed on f(x) before r is no longer a root of the resulting polynomial.  The utility of this observation is that although in general not every polynomial of degree n in R[x] has n roots counting multiplicity (this is the maximum, by the above theorem), we may pass to field extensions in which this is true (namely, algebraic closures).  Once we do, we may uncover a multiple root that was not a root at all simply over R.  For example, if R is the field with three elements, the polynomial

has no roots in R; however, its formal derivative is zero (why ?) since 3 = 0 in R and in any extension of R, so when we pass to the algebraic closure it has a multiple root that could not have been detected by factorization in R itself.  Thus, formal differentiation allows an effective notion of multiplicity.  This is important in Galois theory, where the distinction is made between separable field extensions (defined by polynomials with no multiple roots) and inseparable ones.

Correspondence to analytic derivative
When the ring R of scalars is commutative, there is an alternative and equivalent definition of the formal derivative, which resembles the one seen in differential calculus. The element Y–X of the ring R[X,Y] divides Yn – Xn for any nonnegative integer n, and therefore divides f(Y) – f(X) for any polynomial f in one indeterminate. If the quotient in R[X,Y] is denoted by g, then

It is then not hard to verify that g(X,X) (in R[X]) coincides with the formal derivative of f as it was defined above.

This formulation of the derivative works equally well for a formal power series, as long as the ring of coefficients is commutative.

Likewise, by choosing different classes of functions (say, the Lipschitz class), we get different flavors of differentiability. In this way, differentiation becomes a part of algebra of functions.

See also

 Derivative
 Euclidean domain
 Module of relative differential forms
 Galois theory
 Formal power series
 Pincherle derivative

References
 
 Michael Livshits, You could simplify calculus, arXiv:0905.3611v1 
Abstract algebra